The Mapping Sciences Institute, Australia (MSIA) is a national professional and learned society devoted to map-making and geospatial science in Australia.
It started in 1952 as the Australian Institute of Cartographers (AIC) and changed name in 1995.
It is a national member of the International Cartographic Association since 1964.
It sponsors, along with the Surveying and Spatial Sciences Institute, the Journal of Spatial Science.

References

External links

Professional associations based in Australia
Learned societies of Australia
Cartography organizations
Surveying organizations